"No One Wants a Lover" is a song by Australian singer-songwriter Josh Pyke. It was released in June 2011 as the lead single from Pyke's third studio album, Only Sparrows (2011). Pyke promoted the song with television and radio appearances.

At the ARIA Music Awards of 2011, the song was nominated for three awards; ARIA Award for Best Male Artist and with Wayne Connolly, ARIA Award for Producer of the Year and ARIA Award for Engineer of the Year.

Reception
In an album review, Jon O'Brien from AllMusic liked the "'wooh-ooh' harmonies and infectious handclaps of the driving country-rock" song. Larry Heath from The AU Review said he "enjoys" the song.

References

2011 singles
2011 songs
Josh Pyke songs